Roger Coudroy (1935–1968), nicknamed Salah by the Palestinians, was a European revolutionary nationalist militant member of Jeune Europe and Fatah, engaged in armed struggle in Palestine. He was killed by the Israeli army during an armed clash.

Biography 

Born in Belgium in 1935, he studied engineering and worked in France before moving to the Middle East to practice his profession.

As an anti-zionist extremist, Coudroy would eventually engage in Fatah (the Palestinian National Liberation Movement) and take the lead of a brigade. He wrote a book there: J'ai vécu la résistance palestinienne (I lived the Palestinian resistance) shortly before his death.

It is claimed Coudroy was shot by the Israel Defense Forces (IDF) on 3 June 1968 and became the first European to die on the front against the state of Israel. However media sources at the time say that he died in a firearm-related accident at a Fatah training camp.

See also 
Revolutionary Nationalism
Pan-European Nationalism
Jean Thiriart

Bibliography 

 J'ai vécu la résistance palestinienne, Roger Coudroy, 1968

Sources 

Francis Balace et al., De l'avant à l'après-guerre : l'extrême droite en Belgique francophone, Brussels, De Boeck-Wesmael, 1994.

References 

1935 births
1968 deaths
Fatah members
Belgian fascists